Conesus Lake Boat Launch is a  state park on the east shore of Conesus Lake, one of the minor Finger Lakes, near the village of Livonia in Livingston County, New York.

The park is open from late-April to mid-October and offers a boat launch, fishing access, and picnic tables.

See also
 List of New York state parks

References

External links
 New York State Parks: Conesus Lake Boat Launch

State parks of New York (state)
Parks in Livingston County, New York